is a Canadian traditional Japanese rakugo comic storyteller, theatre producer, and television personality, currently residing in New York City, United States.  He was also known in Toronto for his musical version of Aristophanes' "Clouds".

Biography

Sunshine was born in Toronto, Ontario, Canada, to parents of Slovenian origin. He studied classics at the University of Toronto, where he got his first introduction to the works of the ancient Greek comic playwright, Aristophanes.  He became involved in translating, adapting, and performing in versions of Aristophanes' comedies for the Department of Classics.

In September 1994, his version of Aristophanes' The Clouds opened at the Poor Alex Theatre in Toronto, and, buoyed by positive reviews, ran for 15 months before embarking on a tour of central and eastern Canada.

Other works of theatre produced include the musicals Lysistrata, Assemblywomen, The Tokyo Affair, as well as two operas for children, Allegra's Magic Flute, and Orphea and the Golden Harp.

Rakugo
On September 1, 2008, Sunshine was accepted as an apprentice to the rakugo storytelling master, Katsura Bunshi VI (then named Katsura Sanshi), from whom he received the name Katsura Sunshine. In the rakugo tradition, he received both his master's last name and part of the first (his master, Sanshi combined the first part of his name, "San", meaning "three", with the Japanese word for "Shine", and gave it the Japanese pronunciation of the English word "Sunshine").

Sunshine received his professional debut in Singapore on April 26, 2009, and completed his three-year rakugo apprenticeship in November 2011. Sunshine has also performed in the United States, Canada, the United Kingdom, France, Slovenia, Ghana, Senegal, South Africa, Gabon, Nepal, Sri Lanka, Hong Kong, Thailand, and Australia, as well as throughout Japan. He currently resides in New York City. In July 2012, he opened his own rakugo theatre in his home in Ise, called the Ise Kawasaki Kikitei, where for two years he regularly performed rakugo stories.

Sunshine received his London West End debut for a three-week run at the Leicester Square Theatre in October 2017, and subsequently his New York off-Broadway debut for a similar three-week run at the SoHo Playhouse in November 2017.

Notes

External links
Katsura Sunshine's website
 rakugo.lol
Interview
 Canadian has English-language rakugo dream
Interviews in Japanese
 https://web.archive.org/web/20121110041007/http://www.anemo.co.jp/art/creator/31.html
 https://web.archive.org/web/20150712205317/http://www.e-nikka.ca/Contents/120000/interview_14.php
× 

Rakugoka
1970 births
Canadian people of Slovenian descent
Canadian expatriates in Japan
People from Toronto
Living people
Canadian storytellers